Mark Penfold (born 10 December 1956) is a former English professional footballer who played in the Football League as a defender.

References

1956 births
Living people
English footballers
Association football defenders
Footballers from Woolwich
Charlton Athletic F.C. players
Leyton Orient F.C. players
Maidstone United F.C. (1897) players
Ebbsfleet United F.C. players
English Football League players